Stephen Winchester Dana (born 1840) was an American clergyman.

Biography
Stephen  Dana was born in Canaan, New York on November 17, 1840. He was the son of a Congregational clergyman, and descended in the eighth generation from Richard, through Benjamin, the third son. He was graduated at Williams in 1861, taught in Hinsdale, Massachusetts, for two years, and then studied theology in the Union Theological Seminary, New York City, where he was graduated in 1866. He was pastor of a Presbyterian church in Belvidere, New Jersey, from November, 1866, till July, 1868, when he was called to the Walnut Street Church in West Philadelphia, which grew steadily under his pastoral care and earnest preaching.

Works
He published sermons and religious tracts.

Notes

References
 

American Congregationalist ministers
1840 births
People from Canaan, New York
Year of death missing